The Doliskana inscriptions are the Georgian language inscriptions written in the Georgian Asomtavruli script on the Doliskana Monastery, located in the historical medieval Georgian Kingdom of Tao-Klarjeti (modern-day Artvin Province of Turkey). The inscriptions mention Georgian prince and titular king Sumbat I of Iberia. The inscriptions are dated to the first half of the 10th century.

Inscriptions

Inscription 1
ႵႤ ႠႣႨႣႤ ႫႤႴჁ ႹႬႨ ႱႡႲ ႫႦႢႰႻႡႧ

Translation: "Christ, glorify our King Sumbat with longevity."

Inscription 2
ႼჂ ႫႵႪ ႼჂ ႢႡႰႪ

Translation: "Saint Michael, Saint Gabriel."

Inscription 3
ႸႵႫႬ Ⴑ ჄႪ
ႧႠ ႢႡႰႪ
ႣႩ
ႬႱჂ
ႧႠ

Translation: "Created by the hand of bishop Gabriel."

Inscription 4
ႼႭ
ႱႲႤ
ႴႠႬ
Ⴄ ႸႤ
Ⴋ
Ⴛ
ႶႰႨ ႢႡႪ

Translation: "Saint Stephen, have mercy on priest Gabriel."

Inscription 5
ႨႳ ႵႤ
ႼჂ ႤႱႤ ႤႩႪႤႱႨჂ ႼႤ ႣႶႤႱႠ
ႫႤႴႤႧႠ ႹႬႧႠ
ႵႤ ႸႤ

Translation: "Jesus Christ, have mercy on the church of our kings, O Christ have mercy."

References

Bibliography

Marr, Nicholas, The Diary of travel in Shavsheti and Klarjeti, St. Petersburg, 1911
Djobadze, Wachtang, Early medieval Georgian monasteries in historical Tao, Klarjeti and Shavsheti, 2007
Shoshiashvili, N. Lapidary Inscriptions, I, Tbilisi, 1980

Archaeological artifacts
Georgian inscriptions
10th-century inscriptions